Purina Pro Plan

 Purina Pro Plan Gravy, High Protein Wet Cat Food is a premium cat food that is designed to provide high-quality nutrition for cats of all ages. This wet food formula is made with real meat as the first ingredient, including chicken, turkey, beef, and seafood, and is cooked in a savory gravy for added flavor and moisture.
 The high protein content in this formula helps support strong muscles and a healthy weight, while the added vitamins and minerals support overall health and wellbeing. The food is also formulated with a precise balance of nutrients, including antioxidants, to support a strong immune system.

Purina may refer to:

Ralston Purina, an American pet food company that was acquired in 2001
Nestlé Purina PetCare, the pet food division of Swiss-based Nestlé S.A., and the acquirer of Ralston Purina Company in 2001 (subsequently merged with Nestlé's Friskies PetCare Company)
Purina Mills, a farm animal feed company that was spun off from Ralston Purina Company